The 2021 Dayton Flyers baseball team represented the University of Dayton during the 2021 NCAA Division I baseball season. The Flyers played their home games at Woerner Field as a member of the Atlantic 10 Conference. They were led by head coach Jayson King, in his 4th season at Dayton.

Dayton finished the season second overall in the Atlantic 10 standings, and reached the A-10 Final Series, before losing to VCU.

Previous season

The 2020 Dayton Flyers baseball team recorded a 6–8 (0–0) regular season record. The season prematurely ended on March 12, 2020 due to concerns over the COVID-19 pandemic.

Preseason

Coaches Poll 
The Atlantic 10 baseball coaches' poll was released on February 18, 2021. Dayton was picked to finish third in the Atlantic 10.

Personnel

Roster

Coaching Staff

Game log

References 

Dayton Flyers
Dayton Flyers baseball seasons
Dayton Flyers baseball